Isi Ka Naam Zindagi is a 1992 Indian Hindi-language drama film directed by Kalidas, starring Aamir Khan, Farha Naaz, Pran, Shakti Kapoor, Asrani and Tej Sapru. It was a box office failure. However, actor Pran gave one of his best performances, which was used to promote the movie. It is based on the Bengali play Bancha Ramer Bagaan (The Garden of Bancha Ram) by Manoj Mitra.

Plot 

Isi Ka Naam Zindagi is a romantic family story set during the British Raj.

Bansiram (Pran) has owned and maintained a plot of land donated to him by a kind village aristocrat (Shakti Kapoor). After the aristocrat dies, his amoral son praises the enviable plot and wants it. Bansiram refuses to sell, and the son is determined to get it. Bansiram appeals to the British for protection, which they provide, and he is able to save his property.

Soon the son passes away; his look-alike son, Devraj, comes to manage the estate. Devraj does not consider Bansiram's land a priority, and years go by. The aristocrat's soul wanders and waits in anguish and pain. When Devraj goes to see Bansiram, he finds an elderly semi-senile man and his grandson, Chotu (Aamir Khan), who wants to produce alcohol on the land. Devraj takes advantage of the situation with unpredictable results.

Cast 

Aamir Khan as Chhotu
Farha Naaz as Chumki
Pran as Bansiram
Shakti Kapoor as Zamindar/Devraj
Beena as Kamla 
Rajesh Puri as Jai (Astrologer)
Asrani as Munim
Tej Sapru as Vijay (Devraj's Elder Son)
Babloo Mukherjee as (Devraj's son)
Aanjjan Srivastav as Doctor
Bharat Kapoor as Chumki's Father
Anup Jalota as himself in title song

Soundtrack 
Ramesh Pant write all the lyrics. 

"Gulai Gulai Go Ha Gulai Gulai Go Mile Koi Anjana" — Alka Yagnik, Bappi Lahiri
"Isi Ka Naam Zindagi" — Anup Jalota
"Gulai Gulai Go..." (v2) — Bappi Lahiri, Alka Yagnik
"Tum Jaisi Koi Sunder Is Duniya Me Na Hogi" — Amit Kumar
"Aiyo Arre Aiyo Bina Paas Aaye More" — Asha Bhosle
"Bam Bhole" (Mai Sare Gaon Ka Chaila) — Alka Yagnik, Bappi Lahiri
"Raat Ki Hu Rani Meri Jalim Hai Jawani Jab Main" — Shobha Joshi
"Zaraa Ruk Jaa Ai Jaldi Kyaa Abhi Pyaar Mat Karanaa" — Anuradha Paudwal, Udit Narayan
"Jara Ruk Ja Ai Jaldee Kya" — Anuradha Paudwal, Udit Narayan

References

External links 
 
 http://www.bollywoodhungama.com/movies/cast/5695/index.html

1992 films
1990s Hindi-language films
1992 romantic drama films
Films scored by Bappi Lahiri
Indian romantic drama films
Indian films based on plays